Östringen (South Franconian: Öschdringe) is a town in Northern Karlsruhe district in Baden-Württemberg, Germany. Östringen is a twin town with Abergavenny, South Wales. Until the district reform on January 1, 1973, Östringen means the district of Bruchsal. The status of central government in 1981 was taken over by the state government for city administration.

Extensive deciduous forests take up about a third of the municipal area. The Freibach flows through the core town of Östringen, while the Katzbach flows through the Tiefenbach and Odenheim districts. In the 19th century, a flourishing cigar industry developed in Östringen and Odenheim. In Eichelberg and Tiefenbach, agriculture, especially viticulture, remained predominant.

Neighboring communities
The following towns and municipalities border the town of Östringen, they are named clockwise starting in the east: Eppingen (Heilbronn district), Kraichtal, Ubstadt-Weiher, Bad Schönborn (all Karlsruhe districts).

References

Karlsruhe (district)